Tuta Mionki (born 21 April 1976) is a Kenyan rally driver, co-driver and navigator who was crowned the Kenya Motor Sports Personality of the year 2018. She also holds the Kenya Motor Sports Federation Awards for the best co-driver of the season 2015 (Division 3) and 2016 (2-wheel-drive). Mionki was the first woman rally driver to join the Kenya National Rally Championship (KNRC) Premier Class Motor Rallying.

Background and education 
Mionki was born to Jane Nyaruiru (Wambui) Mionki. She grew up in Thika and attended Gatumaini primary school and Maryhill Girls High School. Mionki later studied at the Catholic University of Eastern Africa and completed her Masters at the University of Nairobi where she majored in human resource management.

Mionki also attended the Abdul Sidi Rally Academy (ASRA).

Career 
Mionki is a human resources professional and previously worked for Kenya Airways, British American Tobacco, Java House and ZTE. She then quit in 2009 to start her own business.

In 2012, she joined racing as a navigator for rally driver Eric Bengi in the Rally Raid. She has since been a co-driver for Victor Okundi, Steve Gacheru, Helen Shiri, Murage Waigwa and Nzioka Waita. She has participated in the 2021 Safari Rally as a co-driver for Nzioka Waita.

Awards 
In 2016, she won the award for Best Co-Driver (2 wheel drive).

In 2018, Mionki was crowned the Kenya Motorsports Personality of the Year, making her the second woman to be given the award after Anne Teith.

See also 
 Kenya National Rally Championship circuit
 Nzioka Waita

References

External links 

 Website of the Kenya Motor Sports Federation

Living people
1976 births
Kenyan rally drivers
Kenyan rally co-drivers
Kenyan racing drivers
Human resource management people
Female racing drivers